Everything Louder than Everyone Else is the sixth live album by the band Motörhead, recorded on 21 May 1998, and released on 9 March 1999, on Steamhammer; their first live album with the label, but fourth album release.

Recording
Vocalist/bassist Lemmy recalled making this during the Snake Bite Love tour, having decided to include an entire show on the release, which they hadn't done before because of the limitations of vinyl. The title refers to a remark repeated by Ian Gillan of Deep Purple on that group's Made in Japan live album: 

Recorded at The Docks nightclub in Hamburg, Germany, on 21 May 1998, Everything Louder than Everyone Else is produced 'undubbed' in a two-disc format. It was first released as a digipak version, later followed by a slimline 2CD jewel-case run. Lemmy says he chose to record it in Hamburg, Germany, because:

Release
In Joel McIver's 2011 book Overkill: The Untold Story of Motörhead, Lemmy is quoted as saying he believes the album is better than the classic 1981 live LP No Sleep 'til Hammersmith, stating:

Critical reception
At the start of the concert Lemmy announces, "We are Motörhead; and we’re gonna kick your ass." Critics picked this theme up, with some advocating that those thinking of buying this record first will be disappointed with studio versions of the songs after listening to the show. 
Andy Hinds of AllMusic writes:

Track listing

Personnel
 Lemmy – lead vocals, bass
 Phil Campbell – lead guitar
 Mikkey Dee – drums
Motörhead - producer
Joe Petagno – Snaggletooth

References

External links
Sample tracks at Rolling Stone

Motörhead live albums
1999 live albums